Neeco Delaf is a French music producer and songwriter. Delaf produces mainly downtempo, chillout electronic music. In 2016 his song "Anthropology" was compiled in Café del Mar's album "Café del Mar, Vol. 22". In 2017, he collaborated with Flora Cash on the track "If You Let Me".

Discography

EP/singles 
 2017: In The Night EP
 Banque
 If You Let Me (feat. Flora Cash)
 Fakir
 In The Night
 2016: Hounded (feat. Andrew Montgomery)
 2015: Anthropology
 2015: Paradise (feat. Fly Nicole)
 2015: Edda Magnason - Cocoamber (Neeco Delaf remix)
 2013: Relax

References

External links 
 Official website
 Facebook page
 Neeco Delaf on Spotify

Living people
Date of birth missing (living people)
French songwriters
Male songwriters
French electronic musicians
Year of birth missing (living people)